ZYX Music GmbH & Co. KG is a German record label that was founded in 1971 by Bernhard Mikulski. It is one of the most successful German record labels of the 1980s and 1990s. Until 1992, the label's name was Pop-Import Bernhard Mikulski. The label specialized in disco, early house music and 1990s techno. Founder Bernhard Mikulski is credited with coining the term "Italo disco" in the 1980s. After the death of Bernhard, his wife Christa Mikulski took over in 1997.

ZYX Music is headquartered in Merenberg, Germany and has offices in the US and several European countries. ZYX releases records in a number of different genres, including techno, hip hop, funk, rock and pop. Noteworthy is that ZYX nowadays holds many rights from some German Krautrock labels like Ohr, Pilz and Kosmische Kuriere, and is also responsible for reissuing many albums from the free jazz/avant-garde label ESP-Disk. Formerly, it held the manufacturing license for Fantasy Records in Europe, an arrangement which ceased at the end of 2005.

Under the imprint Zyx Classic, ZYX has also reissued on CD some important recordings of classical music, including a Beethoven edition.

See also
 List of record labels

References

External links
 
 

German record labels
Record labels established in 1971
Hip hop record labels
House music record labels
Electronic music record labels
Pop record labels
Reissue record labels
Rock record labels
IFPI members